Newport International Film Festival was an annual film festival in Newport, Rhode Island, established in 1998.

The Newport Film Festival was generally held the first week in June and featured various international films at several local cinemas. In 1998 Christine Schomer, Nancy Donahoe and Pami Shamir co-founded the festival.

The last festival scheduled was June 3 to 7, 2009.

The last festival's executive director was Jennifer Maizel.

The festival's screenings, venues and Newport itinerary have largely been absorbed into two festivals: Its successor NewportFILM and to a lesser extent, the pre-existing Rhode Island International Film Festival. As with the Newport International Film Festival, both festivals offer Newport screenings at the Jane Pickens Theater, the city's only movie theater.

References

External links
Official NIFF website
Jane Pickens Theater

Film festivals in Rhode Island
Newport, Rhode Island
Defunct film festivals in the United States
Film festivals established in 1998